Marek Černošek (born 22 July 1976 in Prostějov, Czechoslovakia) is a Czech professional ice hockey forward.  He has played for various clubs in the Czech Extraliga and Czech First League, also he has appeared for the national team, recently in 2008 LG Hockey Games. He won Czech Extraliga in 2006 with Sparta Praha.

Career statistics

External links
 
 Marek Černošek at the official HC Sparta Praha website

1976 births
Czech ice hockey centres
HC Berounští Medvědi players
HC Havířov players
HC Karlovy Vary players
HC Litvínov players
HC Olomouc players
HC Plzeň players
HC Sparta Praha players
HC Vítkovice players
Rytíři Kladno players
LHK Jestřábi Prostějov players
Living people
Sportspeople from Prostějov